The East African Cross Country Championships, also known as the Eastern Africa Cross Country Championships, is an international cross country running competition between the nations of East Africa, organised by the Confederation of African Athletics (CAA). It is typically held over one day in February and features a senior and junior race for both men and women. All four races contain an individual and team competition. Senior short course races were also held during the period where that event was present at the IAAF World Cross Country Championships.

The competition was hosted within the Jan Meda International Cross Country in 2004 and 2009. The 2013 edition was due to be held in Uganda, but was cancelled due to concerns around the 2013 Kenyan general election.

It is one of three regional cross country championships organised by the CAA, alongside the North and African Southern Region Cross Country Championships.

Editions

Champions

Men long course
1999: 
2001: 
2004: 
2005: 
2006:

Men short course
2004: 
2005: 
2006:

Men junior
1999: 
2001: 
2004: 
2005: 
2006:

Women long course
1999: 
2001: 
2004: 
2005: 
2006:

Women short course
2004: 
2005: 
2006:

Women junior
1999: 
2001: 
2004: 
2005: 
2006:

Participation

References

Confederation of African Athletics competitions
Sport in East Africa
Cross country running competitions
Annual sporting events